This is a list of appointments to the Australian Senate, which is the upper house of the Parliament of Australia, filling casual vacancies, from the Senate's creation in 1901 until the present day. There is a second list of invalid elections and appointments to the Senate.

Appointment procedures

States
Section 15 of the Australian Constitution requires the parliament of the relevant state to choose a replacement.  This is done in a joint sitting of the upper and lower house (except for Queensland, which has a unicameral parliament).  In the event that the state parliament is not in session, the Governor of the state (acting on the advice of the state's executive council) may appoint a replacement senator, but such an appointment lapses if it is not confirmed by a joint sitting of the parliament within 14 days.

Prior to 29 July 1977, the filing of casual vacancies was complex. While senators were elected for a six-year term, people appointed to a casual vacancy only held office until the earlier of the next election for the House of Representatives or the Senate, at which the vacancy would be filled by the electors of the relevant state. It was also an established convention that the state parliament choose (or the governor appoint) a replacement from the same political party as their predecessor, however this convention was not always followed.

As a result of the 1977 referendum:
a state legislature must replace a senator with a member of the same political party, and
the new senator's term continues until the end of the original senator's term.

Territories
Replacement senators for the Australian Capital Territory (ACT) or the Northern Territory (NT) are chosen by the relevant territory legislature, under s.44 of the Commonwealth Electoral Act 1918.  Where the legislature is not in session, the choice is made by the Administrator of the NT (acting on the advice of the territory's executive council) or the Chief Minister of the ACT. The procedure has been in use in the ACT since 1989 and in NT since 1980.

Between 1980 and 1989, replacement senators in the ACT were chosen by a joint sitting of both houses of the Federal Parliament, under s.9 of the Senate (Representation of Territories) Act 1973. Prior to 1980, replacement senators in both the ACT or NT were to be elected in a by-election, though this never occurred.

List of appointments to the Senate



List of invalid elections and appointments to the Senate

This is a list of people who have been declared to have been elected or appointed to the Australian Senate that the High Court, sitting as the Court of Disputed Returns, has subsequently declared to be ineligible. Some of these have actually sat in the Senate and participated in proceedings; however, the High Court has held that their presence did not invalidate the proceedings of the Senate.

References

Parliament of Australia – Senate vacancies

See also
 Casual vacancies in the Australian Parliament

Australian Senate lists